Salatin (also Romanized as Salāţīn; also known as Sīr Kāneh) is a village in Osmanvand Rural District, Firuzabad District, Kermanshah County, Kermanshah Province, Iran. At the 2006 census, its population was 87, in 20 families.

References 

Populated places in Kermanshah County